Stadtschloss is the German word for a palace of a town, and may refer to:

 Stadtschloss, Berlin (Berlin City Palace), the former residence of the Hohenzollern rulers of Prussia and Imperial Germany
 Stadtschloss, Brunswick, residence of the Brunswick dukes from 1753 to 1918
 Stadtschloss, Darmstadt, former residence and administrative seat of the landgraves of Hesse and from 1806 to 1919 of the Grand Dukes of Hesse-Darmstadt
 Stadtschloss, Potsdam, another former Hohenzollern royal residence in Potsdam, Germany
 Stadtschloss, Weimar, the former residence of the Grand Dukes of Sachsen-Weimar-Eisenach
 Stadtschloss, Wiesbaden, the former residence of the Dukes of Nassau and current seat of the Hessian parliament

See also
Residenz
City Palace (disambiguation)